The MV Walla Walla (Motor Vessel Walla Walla) is a  operated by Washington State Ferries.

History 
The Walla Walla was originally assigned to the San Juan Islands, however in its first year of service it was reassigned to the Seattle-Bainbridge route for which ridership better aligned with the high capacity of the Jumbo-class vessels.

Occasionally the Walla Walla will still end up filling in on the Seattle–Bainbridge Island run where it spent its early years. In late July 2014, the Jumbo Mark-II-class ferry,  sailed to Vancouver, British Columbia for repairs. Since Washington State Ferries had no large backup vessels, the Walla Walla once again found herself on her old run, the Seattle–Winslow route. As a result, she was the other vessel on the route on the day the  suffered her massive electrical failure.

November 2012 incident 
In early November 2012, during routine maintenance, one of the ship's four drive motors was damaged and failed after it overheated. The ferry was removed from service while a replacement was installed. WSDOT announced that if the damaged motor could be replaced with a spare already in its warehouse, the ferry could be back into service within several months.
The spare motor was refurbished by General Electric in Los Angeles and then installed at Vigor Shipyards. The Walla Walla returned to service in April 2013.

References

External links
 

Washington State Ferries vessels
1972 ships
Ships built in Seattle